Providence Creek is a  long 3rd order tributary to Duck Creek in New Castle County, Delaware.

Course
Providence Creek rises on the Cypress Branch divide about 0.5 miles southwest of Thomas Corners, Delaware.

Watershed
Providence Creek drains  of area, receives about 44.5 in/year of precipitation, has a topographic wetness index of 604.98 and is about 3.6% forested.

See also
List of rivers of Delaware

References 

Rivers of Delaware
Rivers of New Castle County, Delaware
Tributaries of the Smyrna River